Marco Aurélio Iubel (born 7 August 1986), simply known as Marquinho is a Brazilian professional footballer playing for San Francisco Glens SC in USL League Two as  a winger.

Club Career Statistics

References

External links
 
 

1986 births
Living people
Association football forwards
Brazilian footballers
Sportspeople from Paraná (state)
J. Malucelli Futebol players
Vitória S.C. players
C.S. Marítimo players
Esporte Clube Vitória players
Vila Nova Futebol Clube players
Paraná Clube players
Mirassol Futebol Clube players
Saba players
Zob Ahan Esfahan F.C. players
Campeonato Brasileiro Série A players
Campeonato Brasileiro Série B players
Primeira Liga players
Liga Portugal 2 players